Skvortsov (from скворец meaning starling) is a Russian masculine surname, its feminine counterpart is Skvortsova.

Geographical distribution
As of 2014, 89.8% of all known bearers of the surname Skvortsov were residents of Russia (frequency 1:3,590), 4.5% of Ukraine (1:22,597), 1.6% of Uzbekistan (1:43,002), 1.3% of Belarus (1:16,076) and 1.3% of Kazakhstan (1:30,873).

In Russia, the frequency of the surname was higher than national average (1:3,590) in the following subjects of the Russian Federation:

 1. Ingushetia (1:197)
 2. Kostroma Oblast (1:267)
 3. Chuvashia (1:713)
 4. Altai Krai (1:736)
 5. Mari El (1:1,203)
 6. Tambov Oblast (1:1,347)
 7. Nizhny Novgorod Oblast (1:1,624)
 8. Kalmykia (1:1,628)
 9. Ivanovo Oblast (1:1,734)
 10. Yaroslavl Oblast (1:2,141)
 11. Ryazan Oblast (1:2,166)
 12. Mordovia (1:2,188)
 13. Vladimir Oblast (1:2,451)d
 14. Moscow Oblast (1:2,976)
 15. Oryol Oblast (1:3,102)
 16. Tver Oblast (1:3,116)
 17. Volgograd Oblast (1:3,152)
 18. Lipetsk Oblast (1:3,156)
 19. Penza Oblast (1:3,572)

People
Aleksandr Skvortsov (disambiguation), several people
Alexey Skvortsov (1920–2008), Russian botanist and naturalist
Anatoli Skvortsov (born 1976), Russian professional footballer
Ivan Skvortsov-Stepanov (1870–1928), prominent Russian Bolshevik
Nikolay Skvortsov (disambiguation), several people
Ruslan Skvortsov (born 1980), Russian ballet dancer
Valeriy Skvortsov (1945–2021), Soviet high jumper
Victor Scvortov (born 1988), Moldavian judoplayer
Veronika Skvortsova (born 1960), Russian neurologist and politician

See also
1854 Skvortsov (1968 UE1), a main-belt asteroid named after Yevgeni Skvortsov (1882–1952)

References

Russian-language surnames